Ariane Ascaride (born 10 October 1954) is a French actress and screenwriter. She has appeared in films such as Marius et Jeannette (Marius and Jeannette), Ma vraie vie à Rouen (The True Story of My Life in Rouen; USA, My Life on Ice) and À la place du coeur (Where the Heart Is). She also starred in and co-wrote the screenplay for Le Voyage en Arménie (Armenia).

Personal life
Daughter of Henriette, an office worker, and a representative, himself son of Neapolitan immigrant, and sister of the director Pierre Ascaride and the writer Gilles Ascaride, Ariane assists early to the amateur shows in which her father is involved.

Ariane Ascaride is the wife of the French director Robert Guédiguian.

Philanthropy
The actress is a member of the sponsoring committee of the French Coalition for the Decade for the Culture of Peace and Non-violence.

Awards
Ascaride won the 1998 Best Actress César Award for her role in Marius et Jeannette  and was nominated two other times, one for Best Actress for Marie-Jo et ses 2 amours (Marie-Jo and Her 2 Lovers) and for Best Supporting Actress for Brodeuses (A Common Thread; American DVD release, Sequins).  She also won the Best Actress award at the Valladolid International Film Festival for The Town Is Quiet.

She won the 2006 Rome Film Festival Best actress award for Le Voyage en Arménie.

Filmography

Decorations 
 Commander of the Order of Arts and Letters (2015)

References

External links

French film actresses
Living people
1954 births
Actresses from Marseille
French people of Italian descent
French television actresses
20th-century French actresses
21st-century French actresses
French National Academy of Dramatic Arts alumni
French stage actresses
French women screenwriters
French screenwriters
Best Actress César Award winners
Commandeurs of the Ordre des Arts et des Lettres
Volpi Cup for Best Actress winners
Audiobook narrators